Michal Balner (born 12 September 1982 in Opava) is a Czech athlete who specialises in the pole vault. He represented his country at the 2007 and 2013 World Championships without qualifying for the final. His best outing was the sixth place at the 2010 World Indoor Championships.

His personal bests in the event are 5.82 metres outdoors (Baku 2015) and 5.76 metres indoors (Prague 2010).

In 2010 he received a one-month ban after testing positive for cannabis.

Competition record

References

1982 births
Living people
Czech male pole vaulters
Sportspeople from Opava
World Athletics Championships athletes for the Czech Republic
Doping cases in athletics
Czech sportspeople in doping cases
Athletes (track and field) at the 2016 Summer Olympics
Olympic athletes of the Czech Republic